Arthur Rutter (1887 – after 1917) was an English professional footballer who played as a forward.

Career
Born in South Shields, Rutter began his career with South Shields Parkside. He joined Bradford City in October 1909, making 3 league appearances for the club. He was released in 1910, and later played for South Shields, Barnsley, Exeter City and Plymouth Argyle. At Plymouth he scored 7 goals in 19 league games. He remained contracted with Plymouth until the end of the First World War, though when that conflict ended he chose to stay in the Royal Naval Auxiliary Service.

Sources

References

1887 births
Year of death missing
Footballers from South Shields
English footballers
Association football forwards
Bradford City A.F.C. players
South Shields F.C. (1889) players
Barnsley F.C. players
Exeter City F.C. players
Plymouth Argyle F.C. players
English Football League players
Southern Football League players